Cameron Sample (born September 20, 1999) is an American football defensive end for the Cincinnati Bengals of the National Football League (NFL). He played college football at Tulane.

Early life and high school
Sample grew up in Snellville, Georgia and attended Shiloh High School. Sample was rated a two-star recruit and signed to play college football at Tulane after having previously committed to play at Georgia Southern.

College career
Sample played in 11 games with three starts as a freshman. Sample started 11 games with four sacks in his sophomore season. He was slowed by nagging injuries as a junior but played in all 13 of Tulane's games with 44 total tackles. Sample finished his senior season with 52 tackles, 7.5 tackles for loss and five sacks and was named first-team All-American Athletic Conference.

Professional career

Sample was drafted by the Cincinnati Bengals in the fourth round, 111th overall, of the 2021 NFL Draft. He signed his four-year rookie contract with Cincinnati on May 17.

References

External links
Tulane Green Wave bio

1999 births
Living people
People from Snellville, Georgia
Players of American football from Georgia (U.S. state)
Sportspeople from the Atlanta metropolitan area
American football defensive ends
Tulane Green Wave football players
Cincinnati Bengals players